Denis Alimov (born May 3, 1979) is a Russian luger who has competed since the 2000s. A natural track luger, he won two medals in the men's doubles event at the FIL European Luge Natural Track Championships with a silver in 2004 and a bronze in 2006.

References
 
 Natural track European Championships results 1970–2006.

External links
 

1979 births
Living people
Russian male lugers